Thomas Kühne (born 13 March 1958, in Cologne) is a German historian. He holds the Strassler Chair for the Study of Holocaust History and is the Director of the 'Strassler Center for Holocaust and Genocide Studies' at Clark University, Massachusetts.  His Research and teaching focuses on genocides and wars in modern European history, especially on Holocaust perpetrators and bystanders; he also engages in the study of masculinities and of body aesthetics.

Biography

Thomas Kühne was trained in Germany. He received his Ph.D. from the University of Tübingen in 1992.  He held teaching and research positions at the Universities of Konstanz, Bielefeld, Tübingen, and Weingarten before transferring to the U.S. in 2003.  He has been at Clark University since 2004.

His awards include the German Bundestag Prize in the Study of Parliamentary Affairs (1995), two sabbatical grants from the German Research Foundation DFG (1998, 2001), and most notably, fellowships from the John Simon Guggenheim Memorial Foundation (2010) and the Institute for Advanced Study in Princeton (2003, 2010).

At Clark University, he has been engaged in developing the Holocaust History and Genocide Studies doctoral program run by the 'Strassler Center for Holocaust and Genocide Studies'.  He initiated and convened in 2009 and 2012 the first two events of the series International Graduate Conferences on Holocaust and Genocide Studies, a forum for doctoral students around the world.

In his research, Kühne has covered three fields: political culture of Imperial Germany; male bonding and mass violence in the twentieth-century; and body aesthetics in global history.

Political culture of Imperial Germany

Thomas Kühne's early work inquired into the political culture of Prussia, the hegemonic federal state of Imperial Germany (1867-1918).  His dissertation, published in 1994 as Dreiklassenwahlrecht und Wahlkultur in Preussen 1867-1914 [Three-Class Voting System and Electoral Culture in Prussia, 1867-1914] and praised as a milestone in party and election history, elucidates why the Prussian three-class electoral law in Wilhelmine Germany, which even in its time was condemned as socially unjust, could survive for half a century, despite all signs pointing to mass politicization.  As the book shows, the three-class electoral law built on and reinforced age-old political traditions, producing a quiescent political culture that was widely appreciated in the Prussian countryside still in 1900.

Collective identity and the Holocaust 
In the mid-1990s, Kühne's research foci shifted to the history of war, genocide and masculinities in the 20th Century.  Taking up strands of previously established Anglophone scholarship, his volume on men's history in modern Germany (Männergeschichte-Geschlechtergeschichte, 1996) established this field in Central Europe and stimulated a broad range of innovative studies since then.  Covering the period from 1918 to 1995, the monograph Kameradschaft (2006) asks how the myth of comradeship prefigured and shaped the war experience of Hitler's soldiers and war memory in Germany through the end of the century. [1]  Kühne's first English book goes further in encompassing the entire German society rather than only the soldiers.  Belonging and Genocide.  Hitler's Community, 1918-1945 (Yale University Press, 2010) shows how the longing for community, the practice of togetherness, and the ethos of comradeship became the basis of mass murder- how an advanced civilian society became a genocidal society.  The argument of the book-that "the Holocaust provided Germans with a particular sense of national belonging, " and that "the German nation found itself by committing the Holocaust"- has yielded endorsement as well as critic.[2]

Body aesthetics in modern global history

In his current research, Kühne has also contributed to the history of body aesthetics.  His co-edited volume Globalizing Beauty. Body Aesthetics in the 20th Century (2013) links issues of self and society, body culture and visual culture, regional particularities and globalization and provides an interdisciplinary prolegomena to future inquiries in how and why modern societies struggle for beauty.

Selected works

In German
 Kühne, Thomas (1994).  Dreiklassenwahlrecht und Wahlkultur in Preußen 1867-1914.  Landtagswahlen zwischen korporativer Tradition und politischem Massenmarkt, Düsseldorf: Droste.
 Kühne, Thomas (1994). Handbuch der Wahlen zum Preußischen Abgeordnetenhaus 1867-1918. Wahlergebnisse, Wahlbündnisse und Wahlkandidaten, Düsseldorff: Droste, 1994
 Kühne, Thomas (1996). Männergeschichte - Geschlechtergeschichte. Männlichkeit im Wandel der Moderne, Frankfurt: Campus.
 Kühne, Thomas; Ziemann, Benjamin (2000).  Was ist Militärgeschichte? Paderborn: Schöningh.
 Kühne, Thomas (2006).  Kameradschaft. Die Soldaten des nationalsozialistischen Krieges und das 20. Jahrhundert, Göttingen: Vandenhoeck & Ruprecht.

In English
 Kühne, Thomas (2010). Belonging and Genocide.  Hitler's Community, 1918-1945.  New Haven: Yale University Press. 
 Berghoff, Hartmut; Kühne, Thomas (2013): Globalizing Beauty.  Body Aesthetics in the 20th Century.  Houndmills: Palgrave-Macmillan.
 Kühne, Thomas (2017). The Rise and Fall of Comradeship: Hitler's Soldiers, Male Bonding and Mass Violence in the Twentieth Century. Cambridge University Press.

External links 

 http://www.thomaskuehne.net (Personal webpage)
 webpage at Clark University: www2.clarku.edu
 webpage at the Guggenheim Foundation
 Selected articles:

References
[1] https://networks.h-net.org/node/35008/reviews/45032/bonker-kühne-kameradschaft-die-soldaten-des-nationalsozialistischen

[2] Dennis E. Showalter, Holocaust and Genocide Studies, 26:1 (2012), pp. 141–143; Mark Roseman, Social History, 36:3, 2011, pp. 372–374; Frank Bajohr, German History, 30:1, 2012, pp. 120–126; Jürgen Matthaeus, The American Historical Review, 117:2 (2012), pp. 626–627; Jochen Böhler, H-Net, 22 March 2012, 

Clark University faculty
Institute for Advanced Study visiting scholars
University of Tübingen alumni
Living people
20th-century German historians
1958 births
21st-century American historians